Mesnali is a village in Ringsaker Municipality in Innlandet county, Norway. Sjusjøen is an area in Norway that is very famous for its wintersports such as cross-country and downhill skiing. The area just north of Mesnali has one of the largest concentrations of holiday cottages in all of Norway.

Mesnali is also known as the site of the grave of Sigrid Undset, a Norwegian author who was awarded the Nobel prize for literature. Her portrait was on the Norwegian 500-kroner note from 1994 until 2020.

References

Ringsaker
Villages in Innlandet